Anna Maria Šemberová of Boskovice and Černá Hora and Aussee (also written as Anna Maria von Černá Hora und Boskowitz, Anna Marie Černohorská z Boskovic, and Anna Marie z Boskovic a Černé Hory; 1575 – 6 June 1625) was a Moravian noblewoman who, through her marriage to Karl I, was the first Princess of Liechtenstein and Duchess of Troppau and Jägerndorf.

Biography 

Baroness Anna Maria Šemberová of Boskovice and Černá Hora and Aussee was born in 1575 in Vienna to Baron Jan Šembera z Boskovic a Černohorský and Baroness Anna Krajířové z Krajku, who were both members of the Moravian nobility.

In 1590 she married Baron Karl von Liechtenstein, a Moravian nobleman and the son of Hartmann II, Baron of Liechtenstein and Countess Anna Maria of Ortenburg. In 1608 her husband was created the first Prince of Liechtenstein by Matthias, Holy Roman Emperor, thus making her the first Princess of Liechtenstein. In 1613 her husband acquired the Duchy of Troppau and in 1622 he acquired the Duchy of Jägerndorf, thus making her the Duchess of Troppau and the Duchess of Jägerndorf.

Anna Maria and Karl I had five children:
Prince Heinrich (died young, after 1612).
Princess Anna Maria (1597–1638) ∞ married Maximilian, Prince of Dietrichstein (1596–1655).
Princess Franziska Barbara (1604–1655) ∞ married Werner Wenzel de T'Serclaes Tilly (1599–1653).
Karl Eusebius, Prince of Liechtenstein (1611–1684), ∞ married Johanna Beatrix of Dietrichstein (1626–1676).
 Princess Anna Maria (died on June 6, 1625)

Her sister Catherine married her husband's brother, Baron Maximilian of Liechtenstein. Both she and her sister inherited their father's lands, including Boskovic Castle, upon his death in 1597 due to the fact that he had no male heirs.

Anna Maria died on 6 June 1625 and was buried in the Liechtenstein family crypt at the Church of the Nativity of the Virgin Mary in Vranov.

References 

1575 births
1625 deaths
16th-century women of the Holy Roman Empire
17th-century women of the Holy Roman Empire
Austrian baronesses
Austrian duchesses
Bohemian nobility
Moravian nobility
Nobility from Vienna
Princely consorts of Liechtenstein